The 2002 Miller Lite Hall of Fame Championships was a men's tennis tournament played on grass courts at the International Tennis Hall of Fame in Newport, Rhode Island in the United States and was part of the International Series of the 2002 ATP Tour. It was the 27th edition of the tournament and ran from July 8 through July 14, 2002. Taylor Dent won the singles title.

Finals

Singles

 Taylor Dent defeated  James Blake 6–1, 4–6, 6–4
 It was Dent's only title of the year and the 1st of his career.

Doubles

 Bob Bryan /  Mike Bryan defeated  Jürgen Melzer /  Alexander Popp 7–5, 6–3
 It was Bob Bryan's 3rd title of the year and the 7th of his career. It was Mike Bryan's 4th title of the year and the 8th of his career.

References

External links
 Official website
 ATP Tournament Profile

Miller Lite Hall of Fame Championships
Hall of Fame Open
Miller Lite Hall of Fame Championships
Miller Lite Hall of Fame Championships
Miller Lite Hall of Fame Championships